The 1945 Wiley Wildcats football team was an American football team that represented Wiley College in the Southwestern Athletic Conference (SWAC) during the 1945 college football season. In their 23rd season under head coach Fred T. Long, the Wildcats compiled a 10–0 record (6–0 against SWAC opponents), defeated Florida A&M in the Orange Blossom Classic, won the SWAC championship, shut out seven of ten opponents, and outscored all opponents by a total of 356 to 19.  The Wiley team was also recognized as the 1945 black college national champion. 

Assistant coach Harry Long, the brother of head coach Fred T. Long, suffered a heart attack in the first quarter of the Orange Blossom Classic. He died in an ambulance en route to a hospital. The victory sealed the Wildcats' national championship, but, after the game, the team sprawled out on the bench and the ground and wept over the Long's death.

Schedule

References

Wiley
Wiley Wildcats football seasons
Black college football national champions
Southwestern Athletic Conference football champion seasons
College football undefeated seasons
Wiley Wildcats football